Grevillea integrifolia, commonly known as entire-leaved grevillea, is a species of flowering plant in the family Proteaceae and is endemic to the south-west of Western Australia. It is an erect shrub with egg-shaped leaves, the narrower end towards the base, and cylindrical clusters of white to creamy-white flowers.

Description

Taxonomy
The species was first formally described in Stirpium Australasicarum Herbarii Hugeliani Decades Tres in 1830 by Austrian botanist Stephan Endlicher who gave it the name Anadenia integrifolia. The species was transferred to the genus Grevillea as Grevillea integrifolia by Swiss botanist Carl Meissner in 1856. The specific epithet (integrifolia) means "whole-leaved", that it not toothed or lobed.

Distribution and habitat
Entire-leaved grevillea usually grows in heath and occurs near Burracoppin, Quairading, Kukerin and Corrigin in the Avon Wheatbelt, Jarrah Forest and Mallee bioregions of south-western Western Australia.

References

integrifolia
Endemic flora of Western Australia
Eudicots of Western Australia
Proteales of Australia
Taxa named by Stephan Endlicher
Plants described in 1838